L31 may refer to:
 L31 ribosomal protein leader
 60S ribosomal protein L31
 , a destroyer of the Royal Navy
 Nissan Altima (L31), a Japanese automobile
 
 St. Tammany Regional Airport, in St. Tammany Parish, Louisiana
 Zeppelin LZ 72, an airship of the Imperial German Navy